DYBT (105.9 FM) - broadcasting as Monster BT 105.9 - is a radio station owned and operated by Audiovisual Communicators, Inc. Its studios and transmitter are located at West Entrance, G/F East Aurora Tower, #3 President Quezon (F. Cabahug) St., Kasambagan, Mabolo, Cebu City Philippines.

History

The station was established on March 1, 1987, as Z105 under the call letters DYMZ. On April 4, 1994, UM Broadcasting Network acquired the station from  Capricorn Production & Management Corporation and changed its branding to 105.9 Wild FM and call letters to DYWC. It carried a dance-leaning Top 40 format. On May 1, 2000, UMBN Audiovisual Communicators acquired the station rebranded it as Monster Radio BT 105.9 and changed its call letters to DYBT. It carries a mainstream Top 40 format. In 2016, the station transferred from Mango Square Mall to its current location in East Aurora Tower and adopted its current slogan "Cebu's Hottest". The station's slogan is the catchphrase used by its flagship station in Manila.

Recognitions
In the previous years, Monster Radio BT 105.9 has been nominated as Best FM Station (Provincial) until the station won the category at the 25th KBP Golden Dove Awards in 2017.

References

External links
Listen Live to Monster Radio BT105.9

Radio stations in Metro Cebu
Contemporary hit radio stations in the Philippines
Radio stations established in 1987